Jasenovce is a village and municipality in Vranov nad Topľou District in the Prešov Region of eastern Slovakia.

In historical records the village was first mentioned in 1543.

The municipality lies at an altitude of 166 metres and covers an area of 5.651 km². It has a population of about 232 people.

Genealogical resources

The records for genealogical research are available at the state archive "Statny Archiv in Presov, Slovakia"

 Roman Catholic church records (births/marriages/deaths): 1788-1898 (parish B)
 Greek Catholic church records (births/marriages/deaths): 1855-1925 (parish B)

See also
 List of municipalities and towns in Slovakia

References

External links
 
 
Surnames of living people in Jasenovce

Villages and municipalities in Vranov nad Topľou District